
Gmina Rychwał is an urban-rural gmina (administrative district) in Konin County, Greater Poland Voivodeship, in west-central Poland.

Villages
Apart from the town of Rychwał, Gmina Rychwał contains the villages and settlements of Biała Panieńska, Broniki, Czyżew, Dąbroszyn, Franki, Gliny, Grabowa, Grochowy, Jaroszewice Grodzieckie, Jaroszewice Rychwalskie, Kuchary Borowe, Kuchary Kościelne, Lubiny, Modlibogowice, Rozalin, Rybie, Siąszyce, Siąszyce Trzecie, Święcia, Wardężyn, Wola Rychwalska, Złotkowy and Zosinki.

Neighbouring gminas
Gmina Rychwał is bordered by the gminas of Grodziec, Mycielin, Rzgów, Stare Miasto, Stawiszyn and Tuliszków.

External links
Polish official population figures 2006

Rychwal
Konin County